Charles O'Connor Hennessy (September 11, 1860 – 1936) was a New Jersey state senator. In 1916 he ran unsuccessfully for Governor of New Jersey. He played a major role in the growth of Haworth, New Jersey where he founded the Haworth Country Club. He was chairman of the Franklin Society for Building and Savings.  He was a dedicated advocate of Georgism.

Biography
He was born on September 11, 1860 in Waterford, Ireland and had a brother John Aloysius Hennessy. He migrated from Ireland to Brooklyn, New York and then to Bergen County, New Jersey where he lived in Haworth, New Jersey. In 1916 he ran unsuccessfully for Governor of New Jersey.

He served a single two-year term in the New Jersey General Assembly before being elected to the New Jersey Senate. Having introduced the legislation, Hennessy helped see passage of proposals to stage a convention to amend the Constitution of New Jersey, and approval of bills to approve an income tax in the United States and the direct election of members of the United States Senate.

He died on October 19, 1936 at age 76 in Haworth, New Jersey.

Footnotes

1860 births
1936 deaths
Democratic Party members of the New Jersey General Assembly
Democratic Party New Jersey state senators
Politicians from Bergen County, New Jersey
People from Haworth, New Jersey
People from Waterford (city)
Irish emigrants to the United States (before 1923)